The 1996–97 Vanderbilt Commodores men's basketball men's basketball team represented Vanderbilt University as a member of the Southeastern Conference during the 1996–97 college basketball season. The team was led by head coach Jan van Breda Kolff and played its home games at Memorial Gymnasium.

The Commodores finished 4th in the SEC East regular season standings and received an at-large bid to the NCAA tournament as No. 10 seed in the Midwest region. The team finished with a 19–12 record (9–7 SEC).

Roster

Schedule and results

|-
!colspan=9 style=| Regular season

|-
!colspan=9 style=| SEC tournament

|-
!colspan=9 style=| NCAA tournament

Rankings

References

Vanderbilt Commodores men's basketball seasons
Vanderbilt
Vanderbilt Commodores men's basketball
Vanderbilt Commodores men's basketball
Vanderbilt